Oleksa (Ukrainian: Олекса) is a Ukrainian name, a variant of the Slavic name Alexey or Greek Alexius. The name may refer to the following notable people:
Given name
Oleksa Dovbush (1700–1745), Ukrainian outlaw
Oleksa Hirnyk (1912–1978), Ukrainian Soviet dissident
Oleksa Lozowchuk (born 1976), Canadian composer, music producer and multi-instrumentalist
Oleksa Novakivskyi (1872–1935), Ukrainian painter and art teacher
Oleksa Storozhenko (1806–1874), Ukrainian writer and anthropologist

Surname
Michael Oleksa, Russian Orthodox missionary 

Ukrainian masculine given names